The Lake George Stakes is a Grade III American Thoroughbred horse race for three-year-old fillies over a distance of one mile on the turf course scheduled annually in August at Saratoga Race Course in Saratoga Springs, New York. The event currently carries a purse of $175,000.

History

The event was inaugurated on 2 August 1996 with the event being split into two divisions. Both winners of the split divisions were ridden by United States' Racing Hall of Fame jockey Jerry D. Bailey. The first division was won by Memories of Silver and the second division was won by Dynasty.

The event is named for the large lake Lake George, which is located about 26 miles north of Saratoga Springs, New York.

The event was run in two divisions three times, inaugural running  in 1996, 1998 and the last time in 2001. For the 1998 running the event was classified as Grade III.

On November 28, 2007, this Grade III stakes race was upgraded to a Grade II by the American Graded Stakes Committee.

Due to unseasonal rain, the event in 2009 was moved off the turf and run on a sloppy dirt track with only four runners and was reclassified as a Grade III after examination by the Graded Stakes Committee.

The 2010 winner Perfect Shirl continued her bright career and in 2011 the mare won the Breeders' Cup Filly & Mare Turf. The 2011 winner Winter Memories, who recorded the longest winning margin in the event, was runner-up in the 2010 Breeders' Cup Juvenile Fillies Turf.

Records
Speed  record: 
1 mile:  1:35.64  - Dolce Zel (FR) (2022)
 miles: 1:40.11 -  Nani Rose  (1999)

Margins: 
 lengths - Winter Memories (2011)

Most wins by a jockey:
 5 - Jerry D. Bailey (1996 (2), 1997, 2001, 2004)

Most wins by a trainer:
 6 - Chad C. Brown (2015, 2016, 2019, 2020, 2021, 2022)

Most wins by an owner:
 2 - Klaravich Stables  (2020, 2021)

Winners

Legend:

See also
 List of American and Canadian Graded races

References

Graded stakes races in the United States
Grade 3 stakes races in the United States
Flat horse races for three-year-old fillies
Horse races in New York (state)
Turf races in the United States
Saratoga Race Course
Recurring sporting events established in 1996
1996 establishments in New York (state)